William Maguire may refer to:
 William A. Maguire (born 1959), Irish historian
William J. Maguire (1916–1997), American politician from New Jersey
William Maguire (photographer), recipient of  1981 Guggenheim Fellowship